Davazdeh Emam or Davazdah Emam may refer to:
 Davazdah Emam, Kerman
 Davazdah Emam, Kermanshah
 Davazdeh Emam, Tehran